Tuszów  is a village in the administrative district of Gmina Jabłonna, within Lublin County, Lublin Voivodeship, in eastern Poland.

The village has a population of 529.

References

Villages in Lublin County